8th FFCC Awards 
January 2, 2004

Best Film: 
 The Lord of the Rings:The Return of the King 
The 8th Florida Film Critics Circle Awards, honoring the best in film for 2003, were held on January 2, 2004.

Winners
Best Actor: 
Sean Penn - 21 Grams and Mystic River
Best Actress: 
Naomi Watts - 21 Grams
Best Animated Film:
Finding Nemo
Best Cast: 
A Mighty Wind
Best Cinematography: 
The Lord of the Rings: The Return of the King - Andrew Lesnie
Best Director: 
Peter Jackson - The Lord of the Rings: The Return of the King
Best Documentary Film: 
Capturing the Friedmans
Best Film:
The Lord of the Rings: The Return of the King
Best Foreign Language Film: 
The Man on the Train (L'homme du train) • France/Germany/UK/Switzerland
Best Screenplay: 
Lost in Translation - Sofia Coppola
Best Supporting Actor: 
Tim Robbins - Mystic River
Best Supporting Actress: 
Patricia Clarkson - Pieces of April and The Station Agent

References

2
F